Manombo Special Reserve is a wildlife reserve of Madagascar.
It is situated at the village Manombo, 27 km south from Farafangana from where it can be reached by the National road 12.
It covers 5320 ha and is situated along the coastline.

References

L'Aire Protégée de Manombo

Special reserves of Madagascar
Madagascar lowland forests